Kherda is a village in Buldhana district, Maharashtra, India.

 7 km away from Jalgaon (Jamod).
 40 km away from Shegaon.
 Lies in Buldhana District of Maharashtra.
 Village is divided into two parts by the river ‘Nipani’ viz Kherda Bujrukh and Kherda Khurd.
 Temple of Kapilmuni Maharaj in Kherda khurd. In every year at Sankranti there is arrangement of mela. At the roof of the temple there are two trees: one is of neem (Azadiracta indica) and other is of Pimple. The specialty of these trees is that they never dry and they never grow larger than their normal size.
 Temple of Sawangi Maharaj lies 2 km from Kherda and has received many visitors.
 Near about 90% of people are depend on farming and allied businesses.
 The main crop taken is cotton, Jowar, Mung, etc. In irrigated areas, fruits and vegetables are grown.

Political
 In Kherda (Kh) Rangarao Deshmukh is taluca President of NCP in Jalgaon.
 In Kherda (bk) Pravin Bhopale is Sabhapti of jalgaon jamod; M.R. Wankhade cotton market, Dilip Rathi Ex. Sarpanch.

Grampanchayat
 Kherda (kh) : Sarpanch- bashkar umarkar
 Kherda (Bk) : Sarpanch- prabhudas bombatkar

References

Villages in Buldhana district